Edoardo Garzena (4 May 1900 – 11 July 1982) was an Italian featherweight boxer who competed in the 1920s. He was born and died in Turin. Garzena won a bronze medal at the 1920 Summer Olympics, losing to French boxer Jean Gachet in the semi-finals.

1920 Olympic results
 Round of 32: bye
 Round of 16: defeated Roger Vincken (Belgium)
 Quarterfinal: defeated James Cater (Great Britain)
 Semifinal: lost to Paul Fritsch (France)
 Bronze Medal Bout: defeated Jack Zivic (United States) -- was awarded bronze medal

References

External links
pechino2008 profile
databaseolympics profile
Edoardo Garzena's obituary 

1900 births
1982 deaths
Sportspeople from Turin
Featherweight boxers
Olympic boxers of Italy
Boxers at the 1920 Summer Olympics
Olympic bronze medalists for Italy
Place of birth missing
Olympic medalists in boxing
Italian male boxers
Medalists at the 1920 Summer Olympics